Patrick Moody Williams (April 23, 1939 – July 25, 2018) was an American composer, arranger, and conductor who worked in many genres of music, and in film and television.

Biography
Born in Missouri, Williams grew up in Connecticut and received a degree in history from Duke University, where he directed the student-run jazz big band, known as the Duke Ambassadors, from 1959 to 1961. Since music was always his first love, he went on to Columbia University to study music composition and conducting, where his passion became his profession. He quickly became busy as an arranger in New York; he moved to California in 1968 to pursue work in the movie and television field while continuing to write and arrange jazz albums.

Williams was also a leader in the music-education field. For five years he served as the Artistic Director of the Henry Mancini Institute — one of the nation's premier training programs for young musicians seeking professional careers in music.  He was Visiting Professor and Composer-in-Residence at the University of Utah and the University of Colorado, which awarded him an honorary doctorate. He also held an honorary doctorate from Duke University and performed and/or lectured at such other institutions as the Berklee College of Music, Indiana University, Texas Christian University, UCLA, USC, and Yale University.

Career
Williams scored more than 200 films, including Breaking Away, for which he received a 1980 Oscar nomination; All of Me, Swing Shift, Cuba, and The Grass Harp.

On television, his music accompanied Columbo, Lou Grant, The Mary Tyler Moore Show, The Bob Newhart Show, The Streets of San Francisco, and The Days and Nights of Molly Dodd. His jazz-funk arrangement of the Beatles' "Get Back" was used as the longtime theme for the 1970s sports quiz show Sports Challenge, emceed by Dick Enberg.

For clarinetist Eddie Daniels, Williams wrote A Concerto in Swing; for saxophonist Tom Scott, he penned Romances for Jazz Soloist and Orchestra. His Theme For Earth Day was recorded by John Williams and the Boston Pops.

An American Concerto, composed in 1976, was one of the first successful attempts to combine jazz elements with traditional symphonic writing. In addition to An American Concerto his compositions include Gulliver, Romances, Earth Day, Adagio, and August, as well as Suite Memories for trombone and symphony orchestra, which won a 1986 Grammy; Spring Wings, a double concerto for piano and saxophone and symphony orchestra; Appalachian Morning, recorded by the Boston Pops; Memento Mei for solo soprano and orchestra; The Prayer of St. Francis for flute and strings; and others.

Another of Williams' accomplishments was the 1986 orchestral work Gulliver. He spent eight months writing the work, which was recorded by London's Royal Philharmonic Orchestra, with narration by Larry Gelbart (based on Jonathan Swift's writings) read by John Gielgud. For the concert premier, Williams conducted the Yale Philharmonic with Tony Randall narrating.

In 1992, Frank Sinatra approached Williams about conducting, producing and arranging the Duets albums. Williams agreed, and went on to conduct and re-arrange both Duets and Duets II in 1994. Williams often referred to this as one of the fondest accomplishments of his entire career. This was not the first time Williams had worked with Sinatra, however. In the 1980s the two had worked together on concert arrangements, Williams recalled writing an uptempo version of "September in the Rain."

In 2016, Deana Martin, daughter of Dean Martin, recorded a new swing album, which Williams scored and conducted. He also wrote five songs for the album: "52nd & Broadway," co-written with Gail Kantor, "I've Been Around," "Hearing Ella Sing,” and “Good Things Grow,” co-written with Arthur Hamilton and “I Know What You Are” co-written with Will Jennings. The album Swing Street was released in 2016.

Williams was contracted frequently by the major labels; however, he always managed to find time to share his talents with up and comers he believed in. In 2013, Williams produced and arranged two singles for 23 year-old vocalist James DeFrances. The premise was Big Band, swing covers of current pop songs, similar to what Williams had done for Paul Anka on the latter's 2005 Rock Swings album. DeFrances and Williams subsequently created their covers of "Call Me Maybe" and "Suit & Tie". These sessions marked a reunion of the Sinatra Duets orchestra and production staff at Capitol Records for the first time since 1994. Al Schmitt engineered these sessions and setup a Neumann U47 microphone previously owned by Sinatra himself to add to the nostalgia. Williams' daughter Greer acted as creative director for this project.

Awards and honors
Nominated for the Pulitzer Prize for composing the orchestral work An American Concerto, he won two Grammys for his jazz arrangements, four Emmys for his television music, an Oscar nomination for film composition, and the Richard Kirk Award from BMI. In addition to Williams' 4 Emmy wins, he received 23 nominations.

For his 2015 album Home Suite Home, Williams earned a Grammy Award nomination for Best Large Jazz Ensemble Album.

Several of Williams' recordings are considered contemporary big-band standards, including Threshold, which won a 1974 Grammy; Too Hip for the Room, a Grammy nominee in 1983; Tenth Avenue, a double Grammy nominee in 1987; and Sinatraland, a tribute to the singer which was Grammy-nominated in 1998. Williams received 16 Grammy nominations for his compositions and arrangements.

Death
Williams died of cancer in Santa Monica, California, on July 25, 2018, at the age of 79.

Reception
Respected music critic Gene Lees was quoted as saying: "His An American Concerto is, in my opinion, the best mixture of jazz and classical that anybody has ever done. Pat's writing is breathtaking. He's just one of the finest arrangers and composers who ever put pen to paper."

Daniel Cariaga wrote in the Los Angeles Times: " An American Concerto must be one of the most attractive, affecting and original of jazz-symphonic meldings. The style is unrestrained, the tunes ingratiating, the writing expert. What Williams owes to the fair influences of Debussy, Bartok, Stravinsky and Rachmaninoff seems no more and no less than other living composers may owe in those directions. What sets him a cut above others is the individual integration he has achieved out of those influences."

Film credits
Passion's Way (1999): Sela Ward, Timothy Dalton, Alicia Witt; Robert Allan Ackerman, Dir.
Kiss the Sky (1998), MGM: William Petersen, Gary Cole, Sheryl Lee; Roger Young, Dir.
Julian Po (1997), New Line Cinema: Christian Slater, Robin Tunney; Alan Wade, Dir.
That Old Feeling (1997), Universal: Bette Midler, Dennis Farina; Carl Reiner, Dir.
Stormchasers (1995): Greg MacGillivray, Dir.
The Grass Harp (1995), New Line Cinema: Walter Matthau, Piper Laurie, Sissy Spacek; Charles Matthau, Dir.
Big Girls Don't Cry... They Get Even (1992), New Line Cinema: Hillary Wolf, Ben Savage; Joan Micklin Silver, Dir. 
The Cutting Edge (1992), MGM: D.B. Sweeney, Moira Kelly; Paul Glaser, Dir.
Cry-Baby (1990), Universal: Johnny Depp, Ricki Lake, Polly Bergen; John Waters, Dir.
In the Spirit (1990), Marlo Thomas, Elaine May; Sandra Seacat, Dir.
Worth Winning (1989), 20th Century Fox: Mark Harmon, Madeleine Stowe, Lesley Ann Warren; Will Mackenzie, Dir.
Fresh Horses (1988), Columbia: Molly Ringwald, Andrew McCarthy; David Anspaugh, Dir.
Just Between Friends (1986), Orion: Mary Tyler Moore, Ted Danson, Christine Lahti; Allan Burns, Dir.
Violets Are Blue (1986), Columbia: Kevin Kline, Sissy Spacek; Jack Fisk, Dir.
The Slugger's Wife (1985), Columbia: Michael O'Keefe, Rebecca De Mornay; Hal Ashby, Dir.
All of Me (1984), Universal: Steve Martin, Lily Tomlin; Carl Reiner, Dir.
Best Defense (1984), Paramount: Dudley Moore, Kate Capshaw, Eddie Murphy; Willard Huyck, Dir.
The Buddy System (1984), 20th Century Fox: Richard Dreyfuss, Susan Sarandon, Wil Wheaton; Glenn Jordon, Dir.
Swing Shift (1984), Warner Bros.: Goldie Hawn, Kurt Russell, Ed Harris; Jonathon Demme, Dir.
Marvin and Tige (1983), 20th Century Fox Classics: John Cassavetes, Billy Dee Williams; Eric Weston, Dir.
The Toy (1982), Columbia: Richard Pryor, Jackie Gleason; Richard Donner, Dir.
The Best Little Whorehouse in Texas (1982), Universal: Dolly Parton, Burt Reynolds; Colin Higgins, Dir.
Some Kind of Hero (1982), Paramount: Richard Pryor, Margot Kidder; Michael Pressman, Dir.
Charlie Chan and the Curse of the Dragon Queen (1981), Peter Ustinov, Lee Grant, Angie Dickinson; Clive Donner, Dir.
How to Beat the High Co$t of Living (1980), Jessica Lange, Susan Saint James, Jane Curtin; Robert Scheer, Dir.
It's My Turn (1980), Columbia: Jill Clayburgh, Michael Douglas; Claudia Weill, Dir.
Used Cars (1980), Columbia: Kurt Russell, Jack Warden; Robert Zemeckis, Dir.
Wholly Moses (1980), Columbia: Dudley Moore, Richard Pryor, John Ritter; Gary Weis, Dir.
Hero at Large (1980), MGM: John Ritter, Anne Archer; Martin Davidson, Dir.
Breaking Away (music adaptor, 1979), 20th Century Fox: Dennis Christopher, Dennis Quaid, Daniel Stern; Peter Yates, Dir.
Butch and Sundance: The Early Days (1979), 20th Century Fox: Tom Berenger, William Katt; Richard Lester, Dir.
Cuba (1979), United Artists: Sean Connery, Brooke Adams; Richard Lester, Dir.
Hot Stuff (1979), Columbia: Dom DeLuise, Jerry Reed, Suzanne Pleshette; Dom DeLuise, Dir.
The Seniors (1978): Gary Imhoff, Jeffrey Byron, Dennis Quaid; Rodney Amateau, Dir.
Casey's Shadow (1978), Columbia: Walter Matthau; Martin Ritt, Dir.
The One and Only (1978), Paramount: Henry Winkler, Kim Darby; Carl Reiner, Dir.
The Cheap Detective (1978), Columbia: Peter Falk, Ann-Margret, Madeline Kahn; Robert Moore, Dir.
The Lives of Jenny Dolan, TV movie: Shirley Jones, Stephen Boyd; Jerry Jameson, Dir.
I Wonder Who's Killing Her Now? (1975): Bob Dishy, Joanna Barnes; Steven Hillard Stern, Dir.
Framed (1975), Paramount: Joe Don Baker, Conny Van Dyke; Phil Karlson, Dir.
Moonchild (1974): John Carradine, Victor Buono, Pat Renella ; Alan Gadney, Dir.
Hex (1973), 20th Century Fox: Keith Carradine, Tina Herazo, Hillarie Thompson; Leo Garen, Dir.
Sssssss (1973), Universal: Dirk Benedict, Strother Martin; Bernard L. Kowalski, Dir.
Hardcase (1972), Hanna-Barbera Productions, TV Movie: Clint Walker, Dir John Llewellyn Moxey
Terror in the Sky (1971), TV movie: Doug McClure, Roddy McDowall; Bernard L. Kowalski, Dir.
The Failing of Raymond (1971), TV movie: Jane Wyman, Dean Stockwell; Boris Sagal, Dir.
Evel Knievel (1971), Paramount: George Hamilton; Marvin J. Chomsky, Dir.
Macho Callahan (1970), Avco Embassy: David Janssen, Jean Seberg, Lee J. Cobb; Bernard L. Kowalski, Dir.
Don't Drink the Water (1969), Avco Embassy: Jackie Gleason, Estelle Parsons; Howard Morris, Dir.
A Nice Girl Like Me (1969), Avco Embassy: Barbara Ferris, Harry Andrews; Desmond Davis, Dir.
How Sweet It Is! (1968), National General Pictures: James Garner, Debbie Reynolds; Jerry Paris, Dir.

Television film credits
Decoration Day, James Garner, Judith Ivey, Laurence Fishburne
The Perfect Husband: The Laci Peterson Story, USA
When Angels Come To Town, CBS: Peter Falk
John Christmas, CBS: Peter Falk
Inside the Osmonds, ABC
James Patterson's 1st to Die, NBC
We Were the Mulvaneys, Lifetime: Blythe Danner, Beau Bridges
Power & Beauty, Showtime: Natasha Henstridge
Just Ask My Children, Lifetime: Virginia Madsen, Jeffrey Nordling
Blonde, CBS: Poppy Montgomery, Kirstie Alley, Ann-Margret
Yesterday's Children, CBS: Jane Seymour, Hume Cronyn
The Thin Blue Lie, Showtime: Rob Morrow, Randy Quaid, Paul Sorvino
The Three Stooges, ABC: Michael Chiklis, Paul Ben-Victor
Jesus, CBS: Jeremy Sisto, Jacqueline Bisset, Gary Oldman
Miracle on the 17th Green, CBS: Robert Urich, Meredith Baxter
Shake, Rattle and Roll: An American Love Story, CBS: Dana Delany, James Coburn, Kathy Baker
A Song From the Heart, CBS: Amy Grant, D.W. Moffatt, Keith Carradine
A Cooler Climate, Paramount: Sally Field, Judy Davis
Take My Advice: The Ann and Abby Story, Lifetime: Wendi Malick
Too Rich: The Secret Life of Doris Duke, CBS: Lauren Bacall, Richard Chamberlain
A Knight in Camelot, Disney: Whoopi Goldberg, Michael York
Passion's Way, CBS: Sela Ward, Timothy Dalton
Soloman, CBS: Ben Cross, Max von Sydow
Heart Full of Rain, CBS: Richard Crenna, Rick Schroder
After Jimmy, CBS: Meredith Baxter, Bruce Davison
Never Give Up: The Jimmy V Story, CBS: Anthony LaPaglia, Ronny Cox
Ruby Ridge: An American Tragedy, CBS: Laura Dern, Randy Quaid
A Brother's Promise: The Dan Jansen Story, Matt Keeslar, Jayne Brooke
Journey, Hallmark Hall of Fame – CBS: Jason Robards, Meg Tilly, Brenda Fricker
Tom Clancy's OP Center, CBS: Harry Hamlin
Saved by the Light, Showtime: Eric Roberts
The West Side Waltz, CBS: Liza Minnelli, Shirley MacLaine
Deadline For Murder: From the Files of Edna Buchanan, Meredith Baxter
Kingfish: A Story of Huey P. Long, TNT: John Goodman, Anne Heche
Take Me Home Again, Kirk Douglas, Craig T. Nelson
Because Mommy Works, CBS: Anne Archer, John Heard
The Gift of Love, CBS: Andy Griffith, Blair Brown
Getting Gotti, CBS: Lorraine Bracco, Anthony John Denison
The Corpse Had A Familiar Face, Elizabeth Montgomery, Dennis Farina
Accidental Meeting, Paramount: Linda Gray, Linda Purl
French Silk, Susan Lucci, Lee Horsley
Mercy Mission: The Rescue of Flight 771, CBS: Robert Loggia, Scott Bakula
Geronimo, TNT: Joseph Runningfox
Zelda, TNT: Natasha Richardson, Timothy Hutton
Murder in the Heartland, Tim Roth, Fairuza Balk
Blind Spot, Hallmark Hall of Fame – CBS: Joanne Woodward, Laura Linney
Jewels, CBS: Annette O'Toole, Anthony Andrews
In Broad Daylight, NBC: Brian Dennehy, Marcia Gay Harden
Her Hidden Truth', NBC: Kellie Martin, Antonio Sabato Jr.

Television series credits
This is a partial list.MonkExtremeBlack Tie AffairBaltimoreCuttersThe Days and Nights of Molly Dodd (theme and episode scores)The Simpsons: "Simpson and Delilah"The Slap Maxwell StoryFMAfterMASHColumboLou GrantThe Streets of San Francisco (theme and 11 scores)The Bob Newhart ShowThe Mary Tyler Moore ShowThe Tony Randall ShowThe MagicianHerculesThe Music SceneSelected discographyShades of Today (as Pat Williams) (Verve 1968)Think (as The Pat Williams Band) (Verve 1968)Heavy Vibrations (as Pat Williams) (Verve 1969)Threshold (Capitol 1974)Feeling Free (with The Singers Unlimited / The Pat Williams Orchestra) (MPS 1975)Come On And Shine (MPS 1978)Theme (PAUSA 1980)An American Concerto (as Patrick Williams and the London Symphony Orchestra) (Columbia 1980)Dreams and Themes (Allegiance 1983)10th Avenue (as Patrick Williams’ New York Band) (Soundwings 1987)Sinatraland (as Patrick Williams and his big band) (EMI-Capitol 1998)Aurora (as Patrick Williams, The Big Band) (ArtistShare 2010)Moments in Time (as Patrick Williams and Symphony Orchestra) (Soundwings 2013)Home Suite Home'' (BFM Jazz 2015)

References

External links

1939 births
2018 deaths
20th-century American composers
20th-century American conductors (music)
20th-century American male musicians
21st-century American composers
21st-century American conductors (music)
21st-century American male musicians
American classical musicians
American film score composers
American male conductors (music)
American male film score composers
American music arrangers
American television composers
Classical musicians from Connecticut
Classical musicians from Missouri
Deaths from cancer in California
Columbia University School of the Arts alumni
Duke University alumni
Easy listening musicians
Male television composers
People from Bonne Terre, Missouri
Varèse Sarabande Records artists
RCA Victor artists
Capitol Records artists
Columbia Records artists
ArtistShare artists
ABC Records artists
MPS Records artists
Verve Records artists
Warner Records artists
Sparrow Records artists